Peter Borre (2 September 1716 – 20 December 1789) was a Danish merchant and slave trader. He owned the Copenhagen-based trading house Borre & Fenger in a partnership with Peter Fenger from around 1755. The company traded on the Danish West Indies with its own fleet of merchant ships. Borre owned the Irgens House at Strandgade 44 in Copenhagen as well as several other properties in the city.

Early life and education
Borre was born in Aarhus, the son of merchant Mikkel Pedersen Borre (1669–1724) and Anne Mogensdatter Blach (1692–1726).  His maternal uncle was Oluf Blach.

Career

In 1750, Borre was granted citizenship as a merchant in Copenhagen. In circa 1755, he established the trading house Borre & Fenger in a partnership with Peter Fenger. He was from 1761 to 1778 administrator of the national tobacco monopoly in return for 12.5 % of the revenues. He was from 1753 the principal participant in the General Trading Company and from 1759 served as its managing director until it was taken over by the crown in 1774. Borre then served as director of the new Royal Iceland Trading Department (Kgl. islandske, finmarkske og færøske handel of Fiskefangst) and Kgl. the Royal Greenland Trading Department until 1779.

Property

Borre owned the Irgens House at Strandgade 44 in Christianshavn from 1851 to 1883. He expanded the complex with a new building for manufacturing tobacco towards Wildersgade. The warehouse at Overgaden neden Vandet 51A-B was built by Borre / Fenger in 1761-62. Borre was from 1762 also the owner of the neighbouring warehouse at No. 49 and it was after his death owned by his widow until 1802. He spent the summers in his country house  Sophieshøj aat Nærum.

Public offices and honors
Borre was from 1757 to 1776 a member of Grosserersocietetet's governing council and its president from 1762. He supported Schimmelmann's proposal about establishing a freeport in Copenhagen in 1769. He was appointed as royal agent in 1761 and as etatsråd in 1779.

Personal life
On 18 June 1751 Borre married Sophia Aagaard (1735-1778), a daughter of merchant Oluf Hansen Aaaard (1689–1749) and Anna Elisabeth Tvede (1708–47). This made him the brother-in-law of Johan Peter Suhr and merchant and later landowner Mathias Wassard. His daughter Birgitte (1757-1809) married Charles August Selby.

References

External links
 Peter Borre

1716 births
1789 deaths
18th-century Danish businesspeople
Danish slave traders